was a  after Tenryaku and before Ōwa. This period spanned the years from October 957 through February 961.

Change of era
 February 3, 957 : The new era name was created to mark an event or series of events. The previous era ended and the new one commenced in Tenryaku 11, on the 27th day of the 10th month.

Events of the Tentoku era
 957 (Tentoku 1, 4th month): The emperor celebrated the 50th birthday of Fujiwara Morosuke; and on this occasion Murakami himself offered Morosuke a cup of sake.
 958 (Tentoku 2, 3rd month): Fujiwara Saneyori is honored with the privilege of traveling by cart./
 October 16, 960 (Tentoku 4, 23rd day of the 9th month): The Imperial palace burned down, the first time it had been  ravaged by fire since the capital was removed from Nara to Heian-kyō in 794.

Notes

References
 Brown, Delmer M. and Ichirō Ishida, eds. (1979).  Gukanshō: The Future and the Past. Berkeley: University of California Press. ;  OCLC 251325323
 Nussbaum, Louis-Frédéric and Käthe Roth. (2005).  Japan encyclopedia. Cambridge: Harvard University Press. ;  OCLC 58053128
 Titsingh, Isaac. (1834). Nihon Ōdai Ichiran; ou,  Annales des empereurs du Japon.  Paris: Royal Asiatic Society, Oriental Translation Fund of Great Britain and Ireland. OCLC 5850691
 Varley, H. Paul. (1980). A Chronicle of Gods and Sovereigns: Jinnō Shōtōki of Kitabatake Chikafusa. New York: Columbia University Press. ;  OCLC 6042764

External links
 National Diet Library, "The Japanese Calendar" -- historical overview plus illustrative images from library's collection

Japanese eras